John Whittle Terborgh (born April 16, 1936) is a James B. Duke Professor of Environmental Science at Duke University and Co-Director of the Center for Tropical Conservation. He is a member of the National Academy of Sciences, and for the past thirty-five years, has been actively involved in tropical ecology and conservation issues. An authority on avian and mammalian ecology in Neotropical forests, Terborgh has published numerous articles and books on conservation themes. Since 1973, he has operated the Cocha Cashu Biological Station, a tropical ecology research station in Manú National Park, Peru.

Raised in Arlington, Virginia, Terborgh graduated from Harvard College in 1958 and received his PhD in plant physiology from Harvard University in 1963. He served on the faculty of the University of Maryland and then, for 18 years, on the faculty of Princeton University. In 1989, Terborgh moved to Duke University, where he joined the faculty of the (now) Nicholas School of the Environment and founded the Duke University Center for Tropical Conservation.

In June 1992, Terborgh was awarded a MacArthur Fellowship in recognition of his distinguished work in tropical ecology, and in April 1996 he was awarded the Daniel Giraud Elliot Medal from The National Academy of Sciences for his research, and for his book  In 2005, he was elected Honorary Fellow of the Association for Tropical Biology and Conservation during the organization's annual meeting held in Uberlândia, Brazil.

He has served on several boards and advisory committees related to conservation, including the Wildlands Project, Cultural Survival, The Nature Conservancy, The World Wildlife Fund and both the Primate and Ecology Specialist Groups of the International Union for Conservation of Nature.

Terborgh and his work were among several featured in the documentary film, The Serengeti Rules, which was released in 2018.

Publications
Terborgh is the author of hundreds of scientific papers and popular essays, and author or editor of several books:

References

External links

Duke University Center for Tropical Conservation
New York Review of Books: John Terborgh

Conservation biologists
21st-century American biologists
Harvard College alumni
MacArthur Fellows
Living people
Members of the United States National Academy of Sciences
1936 births
Fellows of the Ecological Society of America